The Royal College of Elizabeth, better known as Elizabeth College, is a co-educational independent school in Saint Peter Port, Guernsey. One of the earliest members of the Headmasters' and Headmistresses' Conference (HMC), it is a public school in the British sense of the term. Founded on 25 May 1563 by royal charter from Queen Elizabeth I, the school is one of the oldest in the British Isles and is the oldest public school in the Channel Islands.

The school endured a difficult two and a half centuries after its foundation, with several principals being dismissed or resigning following disputes with the local authorities. In 1824, it was re-chartered with new staff and an improved curriculum to attract fee-paying pupils from England. During the German occupation of the Channel Islands, the school was evacuated to Great Hucklow, Derbyshire. Having been a boarding school since its foundation, the decline in the number of children admitted as boarders following the world war period meant the school became a day school in 1996. The school became co-educational in 2021.

The school teaches around 500 pupils aged 11 to 18. As a selective school, prospective pupils must pass an entrance exam to be offered a place, although the school accepts pupils from a wide ability range. The school charges £4,523 per term, with three terms per academic year, (or £13,569 per annum) as of 2022/2023. There is an associated junior school for ages 2½ to 11 on adjoining sites at the nearby Acorn House (pre-school), in King's Road, and Beechwood (primary school), in Queen's Road.

Alumni of the school are known as Old Elizabethans. Since 1824, pupils have each been allocated a unique, sequential school number. Among these alumni are multiple Olympians, several Bailiffs of Guernsey and a number of notable persons in various fields including the arts, sports and academia. Noted in the nineteenth and early twentieth centuries for producing students who would later join military colleges in the United Kingdom, the school has produced four Victoria Cross recipients.

History

Foundation
Prior to the school's foundation, the Queen's Commissioners raised concern over the civil and religious administration of Guernsey. The 1824 review of the school described how, in the first half of the sixteenth century, the island "was in a state of dissension and confusion" and "appears to have been most deplorable, for ignorance, superstition, and, especially, for the unsettled state of its political and religious affairs", noting that "in the year of the institution of the College, three persons were burned for witchcraft".

In 1563, the Privy Council recommended that Guernsey's "spiritual and temporal jurisdictions [be examined] to reform errors and abuses" and recommended the establishment of a school by Royal Charter. They believed the island required secondary education so that students might go on to preach as clergymen in Guernsey in line with principles of the Protestant reformation. The Charter required the States of Guernsey to found a free grammar school with a schoolmaster appointed by the Governor of Guernsey.

The school was founded on 25 May 1563, by a patent roll from Queen Elizabeth I which read:

Also since there is no grammar school in the isle, to erect a free grammar school there called Queen Elizabeth's Grammar School under the seal of the isle; the schoolmaster thereof to be appointed and removable by the Captain (except the Queen shall otherwise order); the school to be endowed with wheat rentes of 80 quarters a year found to belong to the Queen by the late Commissioners.

The school was instituted in September that year, and was the fourth school established on the island. To create a site for the school, Franciscan friars were moved from land at La Rue Des Frères, a site which the school still occupies. The first schoolmaster was Belgian scholar, Adrian Saravia, who went on to be a translator of the King James Bible. Saravia left the island by 1571, describing the local population as an "uncivilised race" which "hates all learning".

Reform and reconstruction
Over the next two and a half centuries, the school suffered from insufficient buildings and staff and the pupil roll never exceeded 29. Many principals were appointed, but resigned or were dismissed by the States of Guernsey. In 1824, due to increased demand for a higher standard of local education and a properly-run College, the island's Lieutenant Governor, John Colborne, established a committee to review the school. It was re-chartered that year, and by 1826, with new staff and an improved curriculum, the school was ready to attract pupils from England. On 19 October 1826, the foundation stone of a new building was laid by Colborne, and the school was renamed the Royal College of Elizabeth.

The reform introduced a register of pupils, whereby each pupil since is allocated a unique, sequential school number. After the re-chartering, Charles Stocker was appointed principal and developed a reputation for flogging. He set out to raise the academic standing of the school and oversee the construction of the new main building. In the school's first year after the re-chartering, there were more than 100 boys on the school roll. However, over the next couple of years, the number of new entrants decreased to as low as 17 in 1827. In 1829, three years after the laying of the foundation stone, the new building was ready for use. Upper Canada College, in Toronto, Ontario, was founded in 1829 by Sir John Colborne, based on his experience with the school.

In the 1850s, a new form of punishment was introduced whereby the window recesses in the upper gallery of the school were converted into 'lock-ups' in which students would be held during school hours. The wood-panelled walls of the cells were covered with carvings from those who had been held there.

The school significantly expanded both its teaching and extra-curricular facilities in the latter half of the 19th century, building a gymnasium on the school site and purchasing fields in Kings Road for a cricket ground which was completed and named the College Field in 1888. The old school building was converted into a science laboratory, named after Edward Ozanne. Some of the biggest developments came under principal William Penney, appointed in 1888, who identified faults with the quality of teaching and attending to the building which was badly in need of repair. He revised the entire syllabus, introduced masters' meetings to be held twice a term and had reports sent to parents every half term. He revised the punishment system too, only allowing himself and the vice-principal to use the cane, oversaw the reincarnation of The Elizabethan magazine, and formed the Old Elizabethan Association, which set about wiping the school's debts by 1898 through a variety of money-raising ventures.

World war period 

In the 19th century, the school gained a reputation for catering for the sons of British government officials employed across the British Empire, many of whom followed distinguished colonial careers in their own right. In this era, the school was noted for producing students who would later join military colleges in the United Kingdom. 662 alumni served in World War I, 105 of which were known to have been killed and many more died of injuries sustained in battle, meaning approximately one in five of all the boys who had joined the school since the re-chartering had served in the Great War. A roll of honour is displayed in the main hall to commemorate those who fought and died in the war. Four alumni have been awarded the Victoria Cross: The first in 1857 to Duncan Home, followed in 1881 by John McCrea, then Lewis Halliday in 1900 and Wallace Le Patourel in 1943. The four houses at the junior school were later named in their memory.

In 1939, the school remained largely unaffected by the transition from peace to the Phoney War, with many believing the Channel Islands to be the safest place in the British Isles. Precautionary measures were taken nonetheless; air-raid shelters were dug in front of the school's main building, and black-out regulations required some school activities and societies to be curtailed. The air-raid shelter was later converted by German forces into a secure holding area for weapons and ammunition. Following developments in the war in May 1940, all the senior boys were required to join the Local Defence Volunteers and came to school with rifles slung across their shoulders. Many school activities continued uninterrupted at this point, with cricket and swimming continuing in the unusually fine weather. In June however, the extent of the dangers of war began to be realised. French resistance collapsed, after which the island's Army and RAF units left the island. Fearing the imminent occupation of the Channel Islands by German forces, an evacuation scheme was quickly assembled by the school Governors with Jersey and the Home Office, and on the evening of Thursday 20 June the school was evacuated to Great Hucklow, Derbyshire, where it would spend five years 'in exile', during which pupils had little or no contact with their parents.

At the start of the occupation, the school buildings were home to the States Controlling Committee, but in 1941 the German authorities demanded the use of the school buildings as headquarters and offices. A strongroom bunker was built inside what is now the AJ Perrot room, which remains to this day, albeit without the door. Despite the shortages in staff, facilities and money, there were still a number of scholastic successes over this period, with eight pupils receiving scholarships to the University of Oxford. The official liberation announcement by Brigadier Alfred Ernest Snow was made from the steps of the school in 1945 to a crowd of cheering locals, although it was not until August that the boys were able to return home to continue their education at College. German prisoners of war were tasked with cleaning up and repairing the damage to the building, which was not as bad as had been feared initially.

Modern period

The school's uptake increased at such a rate after the war that, for the first time since 1829, the main building was too small to accommodate the students. Rapid development followed, including the purchase of Beechwood, a former nursing home, in 1948 which was converted into a boarding house. A squash court was added, the nearby Grange Club was purchased in 1950 and converted into a library, land was acquired at Footes Lane for a cricket field, and a new science block was built.

The 1990s saw the refurbishment of the science laboratories, improved facilities for sport and physical education, and the development of a purpose-built art department. Having been a boarding school since its re-chartering in 1824, the end of the 20th century saw a gradual decline in the number of children being sent to the island to board, not helped by the increasingly high fares on air and sea routes from the mainland. There was also a growing requirement for independent infant schooling in Guernsey, and so the King's Road boarding house was reopened in October 1996 as Acorn House pre-school and pre-prep.

In 1992, the school accepted a group of girls into the sixth form from the relocating Blanchelande College. They were the first girls to be officially registered and receive college numbers, and provoked the first discussions about the possibility for a mixed-sex sixth form run in co-operation with the Ladies' College sixth form. David Toze's appointment as principal saw a large number of changes implemented at the school. He appointed the first-ever female headteacher of Beechwood in 2000, oversaw the merging of Acorn House and Beechwood into the Elizabeth College Junior School and drove forward the link between the Ladies' and Elizabeth College sixth forms.

Having appointed its first-ever female principal, Jenny Palmer, in 2017, in January 2020 the school announced that "in recognition of the needs of contemporary society", girls would be admitted to the upper school into Year 7 and into the sixth form from September 2021 as part of plans for the school to be entirely coeducational by 2025.

Governance 
Governance is delivered by a board of between nine and twelve directors who serve for a six-year term, with the exception of the Dean of Guernsey, who acts as chairman. In addition to the Dean, two directors are appointed by the Lieutenant Governor and six are elected by the States of Guernsey. Several of the school's directors are former pupils of the school and parents of current pupils. These directors are required to meet both UK and Guernsey safeguarding standards.

The school has charitable status in both the UK and Guernsey. In 2007 the school established The Elizabeth College Foundation (Guernsey registered charity CH91) and The Elizabeth College UK Foundation (a UK registered charity 1120954).

The school is one of the earliest members of the Headmasters' and Headmistresses' Conference (HMC) and is considered to be a public school in the British sense of the term.

Admissions 
The school admits pupils between the ages of 11 to 18. It is selective, meaning prospective pupils must pass an entrance exam in order to be offered a place. Candidates for entry at age 11 sit an entrance assessment in November prior to entry in the following September which tests English, mathematics and verbal reasoning, while entry into the sixth form at 16 is based upon GCSE results.

As of 2022/2023, the school charges £4,523 per term with three terms per academic year.

The school accepts pupils with a wide ability range, though the results of standardised tests indicated that the average ability of the pupils at the senior school is well above the national average of pupils in secondary schools in the UK, and the average ability of sixth-form pupils is also above the national average of the UK.

Curriculum

Structure
The school designs its own curriculum, which was described by an Independent Schools Inspectorate (ISI) report conducted in October 2015 as providing "an excellent range of options" and a "flexible pattern of pupil grouping ... so that the specific needs of subjects are strongly met". PSHE lessons are timetabled for all years below the sixth form, and specialist themed days are hosted further up the school. As of 2015, students typically sit ten or more GCSEs and three or four A-levels.

Assessing the quality of educational provision, in October 2015 the ISI awarded the school the highest rating of excellent in eight aspects and good in the other two. The inspection stated that "[i]n many academic ... activities pupils demonstrate high levels of knowledge and understanding as well as being both highly literate and articulate". The report praised the school for delivering the curriculum with "good teaching throughout".

The breadth of the curriculum was described as "a significant strength" of the school, furthered by the co-educational sixth form partnership with the Ladies' College. The strength of the curriculum for informing the pupils' cultural awareness, in particular with appreciating Guernsey's own customs and culture in addition to other cultures, was also observed, with the cultural development of pupils being described as excellent.

Approximately 40% of pupils at the school learn how to play a musical instrument, and the ISI noted in October 2015 that 'many pupils achieve distinctions and merits in their instrumental music examinations'.

Examinations 
At GCSE level, the school regularly achieves a 99% pass rate of 5 grades 9–4/A*–C including English and Maths, significantly higher than the national average of the Bailiwick of Guernsey. In 2017, 99% of students achieved five or more grades 9–4/A*–C including English and Maths compared to the national average of 66%.

Analysing GCSE results, the 2015 ISI inspection found that "around half of the grades achieved were A* and A grades", that "GCSE performance has been above the UK average for boys in maintained schools" and that "IGCSE results in history and maths have been higher than ... worldwide norms".

The school consistently achieves A-level pass rates of 100%, with between 80–90% being graded between A*–C and about a third being grades A*–A. In 2020, 37.6% of A-levels were graded A*–A, and the highest proportion of A*–A grades in recent times was 49.1% in 2012. The 2015 ISI inspection found that "A-level results have been above the UK average for boys in maintained schools" and that "over this period, just under three-quarters of the grades were in the range A* to B".

Value-added statistics, which compare the results at GCSE and A-Level against the expectations for pupils based on assessment when they joined the school, place Elizabeth College in the top 17% of all British schools. Most pupils who leave the school after A-level study proceed to university or other further education and nine out of ten leavers secure places at their first choice UK universities.

Extracurricular activities 
The school has traditionally focused on hockey, football and cricket in each school term, respectively. A range of other sports and outdoor activities are offered, and the school participates in The Duke of Edinburgh's Award scheme. In 2018, The Cricketer magazine named Elizabeth College as one of the top 100 cricketing secondary schools in the United Kingdom. Representing Great Britain, alumnus Carl Hester has won three medals in the Team Dressage event at the Summer Olympics.

Founded in 1902, the school's Combined Cadet Force (CCF) performs a number of traditional military and ceremonial duties in the island, including the Liberation Day, Queen's Birthday and Remembrance Day parades. Since 1951, it has been the only uniformed military body in the island and provides guards of honour for visiting members of the royal family.

The school has been successful in rifle shooting and has attended the schools' meeting in Bisley since 1906. Alumnus Charles Trotter twice competed at the Olympics, won a bronze medal at the 1982 Commonwealth Games, and won the Queen's Prize in 1975. Several students have represented the British Cadet Rifle Team and the Great Britain Under-19 Rifle Team.

Buildings and sites 

The school occupies  of land overlooking the town of Saint Peter Port. The current main building, designed by John Wilson, was formally opened on 20 August 1829. On the main site, there is an indoor sports hall, hardcourt, pool and an indoor 25 yard .22 rifle range. The oldest remaining building on the site is the cottage on the lowest corner of the current campus.

Adjacent to the main buildings, the school owns property in Upland Road, and in 2020, the school purchased property to the north of the main site, formerly occupied by the Royal Bank of Canada, which was named Perrot Court in honour of major donor and alumnus, Roger Perrot. The weekly whole-school assembly is held at the nearby St James concert hall.

Away from the main site, the school owns two extensive playing fields and sports facilities in St Peter Port – the College field and the Memorial Field – both of which are used throughout the year for the school's three main sports.

The design of the main building was described unfavourably by David Ansted and Robert Latham in their 1862 publication The Channel Islands, as "unfortunately harmonising in its utter tastelessness with other modern buildings in the island" and being "erected at great cost" presenting "a bald, plastered, unmeaning face, too prominent to be overlooked."

Notable alumni 

The school's alumni are often referred to as Old Elizabethans.

Notable alumni of the school in the military include four Victoria Cross holders, Duncan Home, John McCrea, Lewis Halliday
and Wallace Le Patourel. Other alumni in the military include British Army officers Herbert Abbott and Donald Banks, RAF officer and heir to the Seigneur of Sark, Francis William Beaumont, Air Chief Marshal Sir Peter Le Cheminant, Indian army officer Horace Searle Anderson, and Chief Commissioner of Police in South Australia, William John Peterswald.

Notable governmental figures educated at the school include several Bailiffs of Guernsey, including Thomas Godfrey Carey, William Carey, Havilland Walter de Sausmarez, Victor Gosselin Carey, Ambrose Sherwill, Sir Geoffrey Rowland and Sir Richard Collas. British Members of Parliament from the school include Conservative politician Edward Arthur Somerset; and Labour politician Malcolm Wicks; Lord Justice of Appeal for England and Wales, Adrian Fulford was educated at the school.

Alumni in the arts include actor Barry Jones; authors William Adolf Baillie Grohman and P.G. Wodehouse; and Jean Hugo, artist and great-grandson of Victor Hugo; journalist and novelist Robert Sherard; and engineer and author Hugh Pembroke Vowles. Alumni in the sciences includes physician and academic author Dr Norman Hay Forbes; anthropologist Arthur Maurice Hocart; John Richard Magrath, Vice-Chancellor of the University of Oxford; egyptologist Sir Peter le Page Renouf; geologist Nick McCave; and nuclear physicist Ian Chapman.

Notable school alumni in sport include footballers Craig Allen and Chris Tardif; multiple world champion racing driver Andy Priaulx; athletes Dale Garland and Cameron Chalmers; cricketers George Bailey and Tim Ravenscroft; dressage rider and Olympic gold-medallist Carl Hester; squash player Chris Simpson; cyclist Tobyn Horton; and sport shooters Peter Jory and Charles Trotter.

The school is also the alma mater of television presenters Bruce Parker and Murray Dron; UK media magnate, Ashley Highfield; clergyman, historian and social activist, James Parkes; Bishop of Blackburn, Nicholas Reade; explorer Edmund Kennedy; and plastic surgeon Simon Kay.

Principals

The school's first principal (then known as the master) was Adrian Saravia. From Saravia's departure up to the 1824 re-chartering, the record of principals is uncertain. Charles Stocker was the first principal appointed after the re-chartering. Since his appointment, portraits have been made of every principal except for George Proctor. These portraits are permanently on display in the Le Marchant library. In 2017, Jenny Palmer became the first female principal in the school's history.

See also
 List of schools in Guernsey
 Upper Canada College, founded 1829 and modelled after Elizabeth College.

References

Notes

Citations

Bibliography

 Elizabeth College Register, volumes I–IV

External links
 
 

Independent schools in Guernsey
Member schools of the Headmasters' and Headmistresses' Conference
Buildings and structures in Saint Peter Port
Secondary schools in the Channel Islands
Educational institutions established in the 1560s